Little, Brown Book Group is a UK publishing company created in 1992, with multiple predecessors. Since 2006 Little, Brown Book Group has been owned by Hachette UK, a subsidiary of Hachette Livre. It was acquired in 2006 from  Time Warner of New York City, who then owned LBBG via the American publisher Little, Brown and Company.

Little, Brown Book Group publishes across the following imprints:
Abacus
Atom
Blackfriars
Constable
Corsair
Fleet
Hachette Audio
Little, Brown
Orbit
Piatkus
Robinson
Sphere
Virago

Little, Brown has won the Publisher of the Year Award four times – in 1994, 2004, 2010 and 2014.

History 

Little and Brown was established in Boston, Massachusetts, by Charles Little and James Brown in 1837; as Little, Brown and Company it was acquired by Time Inc in 1968. Little, Brown became part of the Time Warner Book Group when Time merged with Warner Communications in 1989. Still based in Boston, the Time Warner subsidiary Litle, Brown purchase British publishers and imprints that became Little, Brown Book Group in 1992. (Little, Brown offices moved to New York City in 2001.)

Imprints 

Macdonald and Futura

Macdonald & Co was founded in 1938 and Futura was founded in 1973. The Macdonald Futura publishing company was sold to Little, Brown (of Boston but already a Time Warner subsidiary) in 1992 and the imprint changed to Little, Brown. The paperback imprint then became Warner, and in 2006 Sphere.

Sphere

Sphere was founded in 1967 by the International Thomson Organisation, sold to Penguin in 1986, then sold to Robert Maxwell in 1989. In 1992 it was acquired by Little, Brown USA at which time the commercial paperback list was changed to Warner. In 2006 the name reverted to Sphere.

Under its Sphere imprint, Little, Brown BG publishes commercial fiction and non-fiction, including crime novels, celebrity autobiographies, romantic comedies and humour. In 2005 the Sphere imprint was nominated for a British Book Award.

Sphere fiction writers include household names such as Patricia Cornwell, Mark Billingham, Val McDermid, Jenny Colgan and Dorothy Koomson; rising stars such as Kate Furnivall, Boyd Morrison and Christopher Ransom; and international bestsellers Mitch Albom, Nicholas Sparks, Carl Hiaasen and Nicholas Evans among others.

Sphere non-fiction titles include bestsellers Sharon Osbourne’s Extreme, Long Way Round by Ewan McGregor and Charley Boorman, Ricky by Ricky Tomlinson, and A Brother’s Journey by Richard B. Pelzer (all No.1 bestsellers), Scar Tissue by Anthony Kiedis, and Is it Just Me or is Everything Shit? by Steve Lowe and Alan McArthur.

Little, Brown 

Little, Brown is the literary hardback imprint that feeds into Abacus paperbacks. It publishes across a wide range of areas, including fiction, history, memoir, science and travel.

Soon after its 1992 establishment Little, Brown published Iain Banks's The Crow Road – and all of Banks’ fiction is now published by Abacus (with his SF in Orbit).

In 2012, Little, Brown acquired and published Harry Potter author J. K. Rowling's first novel for adults, The Casual Vacancy and, in 2013, Rowling's foray into crime fiction, The Cuckoo's Calling published under the pseudonym Robert Galbraith.

Little, Brown/Abacus have published many great American writers, including Donna Tartt, Gore Vidal, E. L. Doctorow, David Sedaris, Candace Bushnell and Anita Shreve.

Little, Brown non-fiction authors include historians Tom Holland, Juliet Barker, Eric Hobsbawm, Thomas Pakenham and writers as diverse as Tim Harford, Professor Steve Jones, Will Hutton and Evan Davis.

Abacus 

Abacus was founded in 1973 as part of Sphere. In the early days it was strictly a non-fiction list with something of an ecological flavour, producing classics such as E.F. Schumacher's Small Is Beautiful and T.C. McLuhan's Touch the Earth.

Primo Levi’s series of masterworks, including If This Is a Man, The Periodic Table and Moments of Reprieve, was soon added and a tradition of bestselling high-quality memoir was established: Nelson Mandela’s Long Walk to Freedom; Gore Vidal’s Palimpsest and Point to Point Navigation; and historian William Woodruff’s double No. 1 bestsellers The Road to Nab End and Beyond Nab End.

Abacus was one of the first publishers of behavioural economics with the groundbreaking Malcolm Gladwell book The Tipping Point, followed by the bestselling Tim Harford Undercover Economist series. In 2009 Abacus published Gillian Tett’s award-winning work on the financial crisis, Fool’s Gold.

Abacus fiction publishing began with Jane Gardam. Gardam has twice won the Whitbread Novel Award, part of an excellent Whitbread record that includes Joan Brady’s Book of the Year for Theory of War, Beryl Bainbridge’s Novel Award for Every Man for Himself and Christopher Wilson’s shortlisting for The Ballad of Lee Cotton. Valerie Martin won the Orange Prize for Property, and in 2009 Simon Mawer’s The Glass Room was shortlisted for the Booker Prize.

Abacus publishes some original paperback fiction and non-fiction including José Carlos Somoza (whose Athenian Murders won the CWA Gold Dagger), Guillermo Martínez, Charlie Connelly and Michele Giuttari.

Orbit 

Orbit is an international imprint that specialises in science fiction and fantasy books. It was founded in 1974 as part of the Macdonald Futura publishing company. In 1992, its parent company was bought by Little, Brown & Co, at that stage part of the Time Warner Book Group.

In 1997, Orbit acquired the Legend imprint from Random House.

In summer 2006, it was announced that Orbit would expand internationally, with the establishment of Orbit imprints in the United States and Australia. Orbit Publishing Director Tim Holman relocated to New York to establish Orbit US as an imprint of Hachette Book Group USA. In June 2007, Orbit announced the appointment of Bernadette Foley as publisher for Orbit Australia, an imprint of Hachette Livre Australia.
Some of the authors published by Orbit include the following: Brent Weeks, R. Scott Bakker, Terry Brooks, Jim Butcher, Jacqueline Carey, Gail Carriger, Michael Cobley, Maggie Furey, Drew Karpyshyn, Karen Miller, Christopher Moore, KJ Parker, Brian Ruckley, Brandon Sanderson, Jeff Somers, Michael J. Sullivan, Robert Jordan, Joel Shepherd and Orson Scott Card.

Virago 

Nearly 40 years on from its beginnings around Carmen Callil’s kitchen table in 1973, Virago has become one of the most successful British publishing imprints and the outstanding international publisher of books by women.

Virginia Woolf's well known cri de coeur from A Room of One's Own, 'if we have the habit of freedom and the courage to write exactly as we think...' was truly realised in the 1970s. The rise of the Women's Liberation Movement was causing seismic shifts in the march of the world's events; women's creativity and political consciousness was soon to change the face of publishing and literature.  Virago owes its inspiration to these times: ` An exciting new imprint for both sexes in a changing world’.

Virago was conceived by Carmen Callil.  From 1973 to 1975 it was run by an independently owned editorial imprint by Carmen Callil, Ursula Owen and Harriet Spicer.  In 1976 Virago became self-financing and independent with capital of just £1,500 and a loan of £10,000.  In 1977, inspired by, among other things, Sheila Rowbotham's Hidden from History, Virago began the Virago Reprint Library, which fed an eager new audience’s desire for women’s history. Then in 1978 the first of the Virago Modern Classics, Frost in May by Antonia White, was published. It launched a list dedicated to the celebration of women writers and to the rediscovery and reprinting of their works, hugely guided by the influential A Literature of Their Own by Elaine Showalter. Its aim remains to demonstrate the existence of a female literary tradition and to broaden the sometimes narrow definition of a classic. Published with new introductions by some of today’s best writers, the list encompasses such diverse writers as George Eliot, Grace Paley, Elizabeth von Arnim, Pat Barker, Edith Wharton, Mae West, Angela Carter, Willa Cather and Molly Keane. It has become one of Virago’s most famous hallmarks.

"The Virago Modern Classics have reshaped literary history and enriched the reading of us all. No library is complete without them" Margaret Drabble

In 1982 Virago became a wholly owned subsidiary of the Chatto, Virago, Bodley Head and Cape Group. In 1987 Callil, Lennie Goodings, Ursula Owen, Alexandra Pringle and Harriet Spicer put together a management buy-out from CVBC, then owned by Random House, USA. The buy-out was financed by Rothschild Ventures and Robert Gavron. Random House UK kept a 10 per cent stake in the company and continued to handle sales and distribution.

In 1993 Rothschild Ventures sold its shares to the directors and Gavron, who thus became the largest single shareholder. In 1996 the directors sold the company to Little, Brown and Lennie Goodings remained as Virago’s Publisher. Virago has flourished under the Little, Brown umbrella to become, today, a brand name and in 2010, won The Bookseller’s Imprint of the Year Award. Lennie Goodings (publisher of Virago) won Editor of the Year.

Virago’s contemporary fiction list includes award-winners and bestsellers including Margaret Atwood,  Marilynne Robinson, Sarah Waters, Linda Grant, Sarah Dunant, Gillian Slovo, Shirley Hazzard; from the Man Booker to the Orange Prize for Fiction.

Virago launched its non-fiction list with memoirs and biography – Vera Brittain’s Testament of Youth and Maya Angelou’s I Know Why the Caged Bird Sings – and continues with the bestselling The Bolter by Frances Osborne; Lyndall Gordon’s biography of Emily Dickinson, Lives Like Loaded Guns;  Shirley Williams’ autobiography; and Ingrid Betancourt’s memoir.

Continuing to publish up-to-date, thought-provoking analysis, Virago has published Natasha Walter, Joanna Bourke, Naomi Wolf, Lisa Appignanesi and Åsne Seierstad’s The Bookseller of Kabul.

Atom 

Atom is the young adult imprint of Little, Brown Book Group. It was founded in 2002 within the science fiction and fantasy imprint of Orbit but has since become an independent imprint focused on publishing mainstream and supernatural YA fiction.

Atom is best known for publishing worldwide phenomenon Stephenie Meyer’s Twilight Saga and CJ Daugherty's Night School series. It is also the UK publisher of many bestselling teen series including P.C & Kristin Cast’s House of Night, Melissa de la Cruz’s Blue Bloods, Scott Westerfeld’s Midnighters and Lisi Harrison’s Monster High.

Piatkus Constable Robinson 

Piatkus was founded in 1979 from the spare bedroom of Judy Piatkus’s home in Loughton, Essex, and was acquired by Little, Brown in 2007. Piatkus publishes fiction and lifestyle titles, and joined with Little, Brown to further widen their audience.

Piatkus publishes a range of fiction and non-fiction. Its lifestyle list covers the areas of health; mind, body and spirit; self-help; business; personal development and all the topics that interest people in their daily lives. It includes international authorities such as Patrick Holford, the UK’s leading nutritionist; bestselling MBS authors Brian Weiss and Sylvia Browne; and bestselling business authors Seth Godin and David Allen.

Piatkus is also known for its wide variety of fiction, which includes romance, historical fiction, paranormal, supernatural and horror. The fiction list includes Nora Roberts and her alter-ego, J.D. Robb, Sherrilyn Kenyon, Christine Feehan and Julia Quinn, and new British authors such as Rosamund Lupton and Carolyn Jess-Cooke.

In 2014, Little, Brown acquired independent publisher Constable and Robinson, and soon merged Piatkus with the Constable and Robinson imprints to form Piatkus Constable Robinson (PCR). Another Constable and Robinson imprint, Corsair, publishes literary fiction and non-fiction separately from PCR.

Fleet 

In 2015, Ursula Doyle (formerly Associate Publisher of Virago) announced a new imprint, Fleet. Fleet's launch titles in 2016 included Charlotte Rogan's Now and Again, Melissa Fleming's A Hope More Powerful than the Sea, and the paperback edition of Virginia Baily's Early One Morning. Its releases include Material Girls: Why Reality Matters for Feminism (2021) by Kathleen Stock, and Did Ye Hear Mammy Died? (2021) by Seamas O’Reilly.

Hachette Digital 

Hachette Digital, formerly Hachette Audio, is the imprint responsible for publishing in electronic formats. The name changed in January 2008 to reflect the widening nature of digital operations.

Audiobook publishing has historically been an area of great strength for Little, Brown: titles have been acclaimed for the quality of adaptation, readers and packaging. Increasingly, these are available completely unabridged.

Hachette Digital has recorded over 400 audiobooks to date, and has published on CD and as digital downloads; all titles are available to buy and download from online retailers such as Audible and iTunes.

Hachette Digital has had an ebook publishing programme for more than eight years, but demand for ebooks is now higher than ever. There are ongoing plans for digitisation, across both front and backlist titles, and there are currently more than a thousand titles available as ebooks.

Hachette Digital titles are available from the major UK ebook retailers, including the Amazon’s Kindle store, Waterstones, WHSmith and Apple’s iBookstore. Hachette Digital has a number of enhanced titles available as apps for the iPhone, iPod Touch, iPad and other devices.

See also 
 List of largest UK book publishers
 Virago Press
 Little, Brown and Company

References

Bibliography 
 Oliver, Bill (1986) Little, Brown and Company, in Peter Dzwonkonski, Ed. Dictionary of Literary Biography - Volume Forty-nine - American Literary Publishing Houses, 1638 - 1899 Part 1: A-M. Detroit, Michigan: Gale Research Company. 
 www.littlebrown.co.uk/about

External links 
 Little, Brown Book Group Corporate Site: www.littlebrown.co.uk
 Virago: www.viragobooks.net
 Orbit: www.orbitbooks.net
 Atom: www.atombooks.net
 Piatkus: www.piatkusbooks.net

.
Publishing companies based in London
Publishing companies of England
Publishing companies of the United Kingdom
British companies established in 1992
Publishing companies established in 1992
1992 establishments in England
Lagardère Media